Alfred Bickel, also referred to as Fredy Bickel (12 May 1918 – 18 August 1999) was a Swiss football player and coach. He played as a forward for local club Grasshopper Club Zürich and the Switzerland national team, participating with the latter in the World Cup finals of 1938 and 1950.

He played 405 matches and scored 202 goals in the Swiss first division from 1935 to 1956, a period during which he won 7 league titles and 9 cup titles with Grasshopper.

He was a member of the Swiss national team from 1936 to 1954, earning 71 caps and scoring 15 goals, including one in their first-round victory over Nazi Germany in the 1938 World Cup.

Bickel is one of only two footballers ever to participate in World Cups before and after World War II, the other being Sweden's Erik Nilsson.

References

1918 births
1999 deaths
People from Main-Taunus-Kreis
Sportspeople from Darmstadt (region)
Swiss men's footballers
Grasshopper Club Zürich players
1938 FIFA World Cup players
1950 FIFA World Cup players
Switzerland international footballers
Swiss football managers
Grasshopper Club Zürich managers
Swiss people of German descent
Association football forwards
Footballers from Hesse
German emigrants to Switzerland